Shift resistor may mean:

 CMOS digital level shifter
 Pull-up resistor